The 2021 Wake Forest Demon Deacons baseball team represents Wake Forest University during the 2021 NCAA Division I baseball season. 
The Demon Deacons play their home games at David F. Couch Ballpark as a member of the Atlantic Coast Conference. They are led by head coach Tom Walter in his 12th season at Wake Forest.

Personnel

Coaching Staff

Rankings

References

Wake Forest
Wake Forest Demon Deacons baseball seasons
Wake Forest baseball